María Genoveva Valentín Ruiz (born 13 October 1995) is a Peruvian footballer who plays as a midfielder for Sporting Cristal and the Peru women's national team.

International career
Valentín played for Peru at senior level in the 2018 Copa América Femenina.

References

1995 births
Living people
Women's association football midfielders
Peruvian women's footballers
Peru women's international footballers
Sporting Cristal footballers